Joe Jones (born 24 July 1995) is a Welsh rugby union player, currently playing for Sale Sharks in the Premiership Rugby. He usually plays as a tighthead prop.

Career 
The oldest of eight siblings, Joe Jones started playing rugby at Mold RFC before moving on to RGC 1404. From 2016 to 2018, Jones played for Perpignan in Rugby Pro D2, French second division. In 2020, Jones signed for the Doncaster Knights to play in the RFU Championship.

References

External links 
Joe Jones stats on Itsrugby

1995 births
Living people
Cardiff Rugby players
Coventry R.F.C. players
Doncaster Knights players
Pontypridd RFC players
People educated at Alun School, Mold
Rugby union players from Wrexham
Rugby union props
Sale Sharks players
USA Perpignan players
Welsh rugby union players